Endothelial cell-selective adhesion molecule is a protein that in humans is encoded by the ESAM gene.

References

Further reading